Taurasia subfusiformis is an extinct species of sea snail, a marine gastropod mollusk, in the family Muricidae, the murex snails or rock snails.

Distribution
This species occurs in the following locations:
 France
 Italy

References

subfusiformis
Gastropods described in 1852